M. K. Sanu (born 27 October 1926) is an Indian Malayalam-language writer, critic, retired professor, biographer, journalist, orator, social activist, and human rights activist. He has authored over thirty-six books.

He is a permanent member of the International Body for Human Rights, as well as the founding member of the Mithram, a school for the mentally handicapped, in Mulanthuruthy, Ernakulam district, Kerala. He was a member of the award selection committee of the Vayalar Ramavarma Literary Award; however, he resigned in September 2019. In 2011, he won the Padmaprabha Literary Award.

Personal life
Sanu was born on 27 October 1926 in Thumpoly in the erstwhile Kingdom of Travancore.

Career 
In 1955 and 1956, Sanu joined the Sree Narayana College and Maharaja's College as a lecturer. He retired as a professor in 1983. In 1984, he was elected as the President of Purogamana Kala Sahitya Sangham and the director of Sree Narayana Study Centre, University of Kerala in 1985, followed by an appointment to Sree Narayana Chair, Mahatma Gandhi University, Kottayam in 1997.

In 1987, he was elected as an MLA from Ernakulam Assembly constituency. In 1991, he joined Kumkumam Weekly, Kollam, as the chief editor. He became the elected President of the Vayalar Award Memorial Trust in 2005.

Recognition 
 2011 – Kendra Sahitya Akademi Award for the biography "Basheer: Ekantha Veedhiyile Avadhoothan"
 2011 – Abu Dhabi Sakthi Award (other category literature) for overall contributions
 2012 – Pavanan foundation India's Award for 2011 for his Autobiography "Karmagathi"
 2013 – Ezhuthachan Puraskaram, the highest literary honour given by the Kerala government
 2013 – Abu Dhabi Sakthi Award for Overall Contribution (T. K. Ramakrishnan Award)
 2014 – Father Vadakkan Puraskaram
 2015 – P. Kesavadev Literary Award
 2020 – Abu Dhabi Sakthi Award (other category literature) (Sakti Erumeli Award) for Kesari Oru Kaalaghattathinte Srishtaavu
 2021 – Chavara Samskruthy Puraskar by Chavara Cultural Centre
 2022 – D.Litt. by Mahatma Gandhi University

Works

Autobiography
 Karmagathi – 2010

Children's literature

Criticism

Interpretations

Travelogues

Biographies

Memoirs

Collected essays

Translations

Edited works

Controversies 
Sanu resigned from the award selection committee and chairmanship of the Vayalar Ramavarma Memorial Trust (VRMT) in September 2019, specifying that he was suffering from health issues. A few days later, during an interview, he clarified the controversy of his resignation from the Trust. Sanu stated that he was being pressurized to select a book which, according to him, scored the least during evaluation. He also said that the piece Nireeshwaran by author V. J. James had scored the highest points in the last stage of the assessment. Later in September 2019, VRMT chose Nireeshwaran by V. J. James for the Vayalar Rama Varma Literary Award 2019.

References

External links

 Mithram
 PRD Kerala awards

1928 births
Living people
20th-century Indian biographers
20th-century Indian novelists
Indian children's writers
Indian literary critics
Indian male essayists
Indian male novelists
Malayalam-language writers
Malayalam literary critics
Malayali people
www.sanumash.com
Narayana Guru
People from Alappuzha district
Writers from Kerala
Male biographers
Recipients of the Sahitya Akademi Award in Malayalam
Recipients of the Abu Dhabi Sakthi Award